William Rooney (July 16, 1896 – March 17, 1966) was a professional American football player who played running back for six seasons for the Duluth Kelleys/Eskimos, New York Giants, Brooklyn Lions, and Chicago Cardinals.

References

External links

1896 births
1966 deaths
American football running backs
Canadian players of American football
New York Giants players
Duluth Kelleys players
Duluth Eskimos players
Chicago Cardinals players
Brooklyn Lions players
Sportspeople from Ottawa